Gooseberry gourd may refer to one of at least two plant species:

 Cucumis anguria
 Cucumis myriocarpus, native to tropical and southern Africa